Carlos López Contreras (born January 31, 1942) is a Honduran politician and member of the National Party. He served as Foreign Minister from July 13, 2009 to January 27, 2010 under the interim presidency of Roberto Micheletti. He was an Ambassador in Belgium and in the Netherlands.

References

1942 births
Living people
Foreign Ministers of Honduras
National Party of Honduras politicians
Government ministers of Honduras
Ambassadors of Honduras to the Netherlands
Ambassadors of Honduras to Belgium